Bruce Lachlan Neish (born 23 August 1950) is a former Australian rules footballer who played for Essendon and Footscray in the Victorian Football League (VFL) during the early 1970s.

On debut, Neish kicked four out of his team's seven goals in a loss to Melbourne at the MCG. He spent two further seasons in the VFL, the second of which was with Footscray. Neish was used mainly as a half back and ruck rover.

He was with Sunshine for one and a half years before moving to Tasmania in 1974 where he played for East Devonport and then North Launceston. Neith represented the Tasmanian interstate team in the 1975 Knockout Carnival.

References

Bruce Neish's playing statistics from The VFA Project
Holmesby, Russell and Main, Jim (2007). The Encyclopedia of AFL Footballers. 7th ed. Melbourne: Bas Publishing.

1950 births
Living people
Australian people of Scottish descent
Essendon Football Club players
Western Bulldogs players
East Devonport Football Club players
North Launceston Football Club players
Sunshine Football Club (VFA) players
Doutta Stars Football Club players
Australian rules footballers from Victoria (Australia)